The 143rd Pennsylvania Volunteer Infantry was an infantry regiment that served in the Union Army during the American Civil War.

Service
The 143rd Pennsylvania Infantry was organized at Wilkes-Barre, Pennsylvania and mustered in for a three year enlistment on October 18, 1862 under the command of Colonel Edmund Lovell Dana.

The regiment was attached to 1st Brigade, Defenses of Washington, north of the Potomac River, to January 1863. 2nd Brigade, 3rd Division, I Corps, Army of the Potomac, to December 1863. 1st Brigade, 3rd Division, I Corps, to March 1864. 3rd Brigade, 4th Division, V Corps, to June 1864. 1st Brigade, 1st Division, V Corps, to September 1864. 1st Brigade, 3rd Division, V Corps, to February 1865. Hart's Island, New York Harbor, Department of the East, to June 1865.

The 143rd Pennsylvania Infantry mustered out June 12, 1865.

Detailed service
Left Pennsylvania for Washington, D.C., November 7, and served duty in the defenses of that city until January 17, 1863. Ordered to join the Army of the Potomac in the field January 1863. Duty at Belle Plains, Va., until April 27. Chancellorsville Campaign April 27-May 6. Operations at Pollock's Mill Creek April 29-May 2. Battle of Chancellorsville May 2-5. Gettysburg Campaign June 11-July 24. Battle of Gettysburg July 1-3. Pursuit of Lee July 5-24. Duty at Bealeton Station until October. Bristoe Campaign October 9-22. Haymarket October 19. Advance to line of the Rappahannock November 7-8. Warrenton November 7. Guard at Manassas Junction November 22-December 5. Demonstration on the Rapidan February 6-7, 1864. Duty near Culpeper until May. Rapidan Campaign May 4-June 12. Battle of the Wilderness May 5-7. Laurel Hill May 8. Spotsylvania May 8-12. Spotsylvania Court House May 12-21. Assault on the Salient May 12. North Anna River May 23-26. Jericho Ford May 25. On line of the Pamunkey May 26-28. Totopotomoy May 28-31. Cold Harbor June 1-12. Bethesda Church June 1-3. Before Petersburg June 16-18. Siege of Petersburg June 16, 1864 to February 10, 1865. Mine Explosion July 30, 1864 (reserve). Weldon Railroad August 18-21. Boydton Plank Road, Hatcher's Run, October 27-28. Warren's Raid to Weldon Railroad December 7-12. Dabney's Mills, Hatcher's Run, February 5-7, 1865. Ordered to New York February 10. Assigned to duty at Hart's Island, New York Harbor, guarding prison camp, and escorting recruits and convalescents to the front until June.

Casualties
The regiment lost a total of 303 men during service; 8 officers and 143 enlisted men killed or mortally wounded, 2 officers and 150 enlisted men died of disease.

Commanders
 Colonel Edmund L. Dana
 Lieutenant Colonel John D. Musser - killed in action at the Battle of the Wilderness, May 6, 1864
 Lieutenant Colonel George Nicholas Reichard
 Captain Chester K. Hughes - commanded at the Battle of Globe Tavern

Notable members
 Sergeant Patrick DeLacy, Company A - Medal of Honor recipient for action at the Battle of the Wilderness
 Sergeant James M. Rutter, Company C - Medal of Honor recipient for action at the Battle of Gettysburg

See also

 List of Pennsylvania Civil War Units
 Pennsylvania in the Civil War

References
 Association of the 143rd Regiment, Pennsylvania Volunteers, Second Brigade, Third Division, First Army Corps (S.l.: s.n.), 1889.
 Dedication of Monument and Reunion at Gettysburg, September 11 and 12, 1889 (Scranton, PA: Press of the Sunday News), 1889.
 Dougherty, James J. Stone's Brigade and the Fight for the McPherson Farm: Battle of Gettysburg, July 1, 1863 (Conshohocken, PA: Combined Pub.), 2001. 
 Dyer, Frederick H. A Compendium of the War of the Rebellion (Des Moines, IA: Dyer Pub. Co.), 1908.
 Harris, Avery. Avery Harris Civil War Journal (Luzerne, PA: Luzerne National Bank), 2000. 
Attribution

External links
 143rd Pennsylvania Infantry monuments at Gettysburg Battlefield

Military units and formations established in 1862
Military units and formations disestablished in 1865
Units and formations of the Union Army from Pennsylvania